Dunes-de-la-Moraine-d'Harricana Ecological Reserve is an ecological reserve in Quebec, Canada. It was established on August 19, 1994.

References

External links
 Official website from Government of Québec

Nature reserves in Quebec
Protected areas established in 1994
Rouyn-Noranda
Protected areas of Abitibi-Témiscamingue
1994 establishments in Quebec